Nokomis High School is a coed public high school located in Nokomis, Illinois in Montgomery County serving Community Unit School District 22.

Student organizations

Local Organizations
 Art Club
 Fine Arts Club
 Science Club
 Student Council
 Yearbook

National Organizations
 FFA
 FCCLA
 WYSE
 National Honor Society

Interscholastic athletics & activities
Nokomis High School sponsors teams named the Redskins and Lady Redskins that compete as members of the Illinois High School Association (IHSA) and the Prairie State Conference:

Boys sports
 Baseball 
 Basketball (Freshman-Sophomore, JV & Varsity)
 Football
 Golf

Girls sports
 Basketball (JV & Varsity)
 Cheerleading
 Golf
 Softball
 VolleyballActivities Scholastic Bowl

The girls basketball team won the IHSA Class A State Championship''' in 1997-98 and repeated in 1998–99. Since winning their first Regional championship in 1988. the school has won 7 Regional, 2 Sectional, 2 Super-Sectional, and 2 State titles.

The boys basketball team has qualified for the IHSA State Finals five times, placing 2nd in 2007-08 and 3rd in 2012–13 in the Class 1A State Championships. Over the years since winning its first trophy in 1910, the school has won 4 District, 17 Regional, 5 Sectional, and 4 Super-Sectional titles.

The football team has qualified for the state playoffs 14 times since 1977–78, but has never advanced beyond the second round. They lost in the 2013 first round.

The baseball, softball, and volleyball teams have all won multiple regional titles through the years, but only the 1977 baseball team has advanced beyond the sectional tournament, with that 1977 team losing in the first round of the state tournament.

See also
 Native American mascot controversy
 Sports teams named Redskins

External links
 Nokomis High website

References

Public high schools in Illinois
Schools in Montgomery County, Illinois
Education in Montgomery County, Illinois